The 1959–60 Primeira Divisão was the 26th season of top-tier football in Portugal.

Overview
It was contested by 14 teams, and S.L. Benfica won the championship.

League standings

Results

References

Primeira Liga seasons
1959–60 in Portuguese football
Portugal